Noa Palatchy (born ) is an Israeli group rhythmic gymnast.
She represents her nation at international competitions.

She participated at the 2012 Summer Olympics in London.
She also competed at world championships, including at the 2010 and 2011 World Rhythmic Gymnastics Championships.

References

External links
 
 Rhythmic gymnastics team impresses, reaches Olympics final at The Jerusalem Post
 Israel’s rhythmic gymnastics team heads to Olympic finals at jta.org
 Olympics Day 16 - Gymnastics - Rhythmic photos at Zimbio.com
 Noa Palatchy Hoop 2008 Deleanu Cup on YouTube (video)

1994 births
Living people
Israeli rhythmic gymnasts
Place of birth missing (living people)
Gymnasts at the 2012 Summer Olympics
Olympic gymnasts of Israel
Medalists at the Rhythmic Gymnastics World Championships
20th-century Israeli women
21st-century Israeli women